Robert Rose may refer to:

 Robert E. Rose (1939-2022), American politician, Lieutenant Governor of Nevada
 Robert L. Rose (1804–1877), U.S. Representative from New York
 Robert N. Rose (born 1951), U.S. Cybersecurity expert
 Robert R. Rose Jr. (1915–1997), American judge, justice of the Wyoming Supreme Court
 Robert S. Rose (1774–1835), U.S. Representative from New York
 Robert Rose (basketball) (born 1964), retired American/Australian basketball player
 Bob Rose (footballer) (1928–2003), Australian rules footballer (1946–1955) and coach
 Robert Rose (sportsman) (1952–1999), Australian rules footballer (1970–1973) and cricketer
 Bobby Rose (baseball) (born 1967), American former MLB and NPB baseball player
 Robert Kevin Rose (born 1977), American, entrepreneur and on-air talent from California
 Bob Rose (politician) (1933–2000), Canadian politician, Progressive Conservative member of the Legislative Assembly of Manitoba, 1990–1995
 Bob Rose (Manitoba Liberal) (born 1931), Canadian politician, Liberal member of the Legislative Assembly of Manitoba, 1988–1990
 Bobby G. Rose, American politician write-in candidate in the United States House of Representatives elections in Illinois, 2010
 Robert Rose (gridiron football) (born 1987), American football defensive end
 Robert John Rose (1930-2022), American prelate of the Roman Catholic Church

See also 
 Bert Rose (1919–2001), American football executive
 Bob Roses (born 1947), American politician
 Robert Rosen (disambiguation)
 Bob & Rose, a British television drama